Philip or Phil Solomon may refer to:
Phil Solomon (filmmaker) (1954-2019), American experimental filmmaker
Phil Solomon (music executive) (1924–2011), Northern Irish music executive and businessman
Philip Solomon (1926–2002), American psychiatrist
Philip Solomon (medium) (born 1959), British spiritualist medium